The Raw Materials Research and Development Council (RMRDC) is a federal government of Nigerian agency for research institutions that is responsible for industrial raw materials growth, promotion and utilization supervised by Federal Ministry of Sciences and Technology. It has it head office at Maitama district Garki, Abuja. The current director-general is Ibrahim Hussaini Doko.

Establishments 
It was established by the recommendations of workshops on industrials matters in 1987 by the Decree 39 (RMRDC) Act CAP R.3 laws of federation of Nigeria, 2004 but was first organized by the former Ministry of Industry, Nigeria Institute of Social and Economic Research and Manufacturers Association of Nigeria which was set up in 1983.

At the time of it establishment, the foreign dwindling exchange earning was expanded in petroleum, import of products and raw materials were fully available in Nigeria began it first operations in Lagos.

Role and aims 
The research councils aims is to developed and utilized the industrial growth based on raw materials and to provides or enable informations in appropriate policies guiding exploitation and investment in Nigeria.

Publications 
 Exhibition of raw materials process equipment and technology exhibition of products of raw materials R & D results Techno-Expo 2013 and RMRDC silver jubilee. Raw Materials Research and Development Council, Federal Ministry of Science & Technology. 101 pages, 12–15 February 2013
 Industrial raw materials development in Nigeria: Professor Onwualu's score card (2005-2013), A P Onwualu; M L Buga. , . viii, 295 pages
 Priority investment profiles of cottage industries in Edo State. Family Economic Advancement Programme (Nigeria), Prepared for Family Economic Advancement Programme (FEAP). Raw Materials Research and Development Council Nigeria, 1998, 82 pages
 Avocado utilization: its industrial and economic potentials:Raw Materials Research and Development Council Nigeria. Federal Ministry of Science and Technology; Raw Materials Research and Development Council (RMRDC), Federal Ministry of Science and Technology. National government publication, February 2010. H D Ibrahim and A A Ogunwusi.

Notes 

1987 establishments in Nigeria
Government agencies with year of establishment missing
Government agencies of Nigeria